Songs of a Rag Doll is the third studio album release by Swedish Singer-songwriter Miss Li. It was released on 17 October 2007, only five months after the release of God Put a Rainbow in the Sky. The album debuted and peaked at number 23 on the Swedish Albums Chart.

Track listing
 "Why Don't You Love Me" – 3:28
 "Gotta Leave My Troubles Behind" – 2:25
 "Take a Shower!" – 3:04
 "Come Over to My Place" – 2:44
 "Tuck You In" – 2:43
 "Leave My Man Alone" – 4:23
 "Why Should I Conquer the World" – 3:45
 "Ba Ba Ba" – 3:34
 "Trouble Rumble" – 0:47
 "Not That Kind of Girl" – 3:21

Charts

References

2007 albums
Miss Li albums